Robert Rowthorn (born 20 August 1939) is Emeritus Professor of Economics at the University of Cambridge and has been elected as a Life Fellow of King’s College. He is also a senior research fellow of the Centre for Population Research at the Department of Social Policy and Intervention, University of Oxford.

Life
Rowthorn was born in 1939 in Newport, Monmouthshire, Wales. He attended Jesus College, Oxford reading mathematics. He took a post-graduate research fellowship at Berkeley again in mathematics. He returned to Oxford and switched to economics, taking a two-year B.Phil. He then got a job at Cambridge as an economist.

He was an editor of the radical newspaper The Black Dwarf.

He has authored many books and academic articles on economic growth, structural change and employment. His work has been influenced by Karl Marx and critics of capitalism. He has worked as a consultant to various UK government departments and private sector firms and organisations, and to international organisations such as the International Monetary Fund, the United Nations Conference on Trade and Development (UNCTAD) and the International Labour Organization. Many of his publications have a Marxist slant.

Rowthorn has been described by Susan Strange as being one of the few Marxists (another being Stephen Hymer) who is read in business schools.

Among other things, he has identified the so-called paradox of costs, whereby higher real wages lead to higher profit margins.

Selected works

Books 
 
  Thames Papers in Political Economy.
 
  Pdf.

Book chapters

Journal articles 
 

 
 
 
In response to: 
and: 
 
 
 
  Pdf.
 
  Pdf.

Notes

References 
 Dworkin, Dennis. Cultural Marxism in Postwar Britain: History, the New Left, and the Origins of Cultural Studies, Duke University Press Books, 1997, 
 Glyn, Andrew. Review of Capitalism, Conflict and Inflation, Marxism Today, June 1980
 Ietto-Gillies, Grazia. "Was Deindustrialization in the UK Inevitable? Some Comments on the Rowthorn-Wells Analysis", International Review of Applied Economics Vol. 4 (2). pp. 209–23. June 1990.
 Mickiewicz, T; Zalewska, A. "De-industrialisation: Rowthorn and Wells' Model Revisited", Acta Oeconomica Vol. 56 (2). pp. 143–66. June 2006.
 Strange, Susan. Casino Capitalism, Manchester University Press, 1997, 
 Thirlwall, A. P. "Rowthorn's Interpretation of Verdoorn's Law", in Economic growth in theory and practice: A Kaldorian perspective. King, John E., ed., Elgar Reference Collection. International Library of Critical Writings in Economics. Aldershot, U.K.: Elgar; distributed in the U.S. by Ashgate, Brookfield, Vt. pp. 392–94. 1994. Previously Published 1980.

1939 births
Living people
Marxist theorists
Marxian economists
Deutscher Memorial Prize winners
Fellows of King's College, Cambridge
Alumni of Jesus College, Oxford
People from Newport, Wales
People educated at Newport High School